The following outline is provided as an overview of and topical guide to management:

Business management – management of a business. Business management rule #1 is delegation, assign the best qualified people to each position and trust your staff to do the work instead of trying to do everything yourself. It includes all aspects of overseeing and supervising business operations. Management is the act of allocating resources to accomplish desired goals and objectives efficiently and effectively; it comprises planning, organizing, staffing, leading or directing, and controlling an organization (a group of one or more people or entities) or effort for the purpose of accomplishing a goal.

Overview

Types of organizations

 
 
 
  – Autonomous association of persons united voluntarily to meet their common economic, social, and cultural needs and aspirations through a jointly owned and democratically controlled enterprise

Areas of management application
Management application can be utilised by a person or a group of people and by a company or a group of companies depending upon the type of management skills being used.  Management can be applied to every aspect of activity of a person or an organization:

Self-management skills 

Self-governance is the act of conducting oneself to get things done. Effective management of oneself is a natural prerequisite of effective management. Personal skills related to business activity include:
  – getting the right things done. Peter Drucker reminds us that "effectiveness can and must be learned".
 Self-control – in the general sense, controlling one's own actions and states
  
  
  
  
  
 Personal resource management

General organization management skills
 Administration
  
  
  is a field of management focused on organizational changes. It aims to ensure that  methods and procedures are used for efficient and prompt handling of all changes to controlled IT infrastructure, in order to minimize the number and impact of any related incidents upon service. 
  
  
  
  
  
  
  
  
  
 
  
  
  
  
  
  
  
  
  
  
  
  
  
  – Ensemble of activities of planning and monitoring the performance of a process, especially in the sense of business process, often confused with reengineering
  
 
 
  
  
  
  management specialism aiming to reduce different risks related to a preselected domain to the level accepted by society. It may include numerous types of threats caused by environment, technology, humans, organizations, and politics.
  
  
  
  
  
 , The discipline of using mathematical modeling and other analytical methods, to help make better business management decisions.
  – Superset of management techniques and strategies that allows order to emerge by giving organizations the space to self-organize, evolve and adapt, encompassing Agile, Evolutionary and Lean approaches, as well as many others
  – Area of business that is concerned with the production of good quality goods and services, and involves the responsibility of ensuring that business operations are efficient and effective. It is the management of resources, the distribution of goods and services to customers, and the analysis of queue systems.
  Theory of management that analyzes and synthesizes workflow processes, improving labor productivity.

Department management
  
  
  
  
 Financial management

Field- or organization-specific management

Business strategy

Business analysis 

Business analysis – set of tasks, knowledge, and techniques required to identify business needs and determine solutions to business problems. Solutions often include a systems development component, but may also consist of process improvement or organizational change.

Goal setting 

Goal setting – involves establishing specific, measurable and time targeted objectives
 Goal – or objective consists of a projected state of affairs which a person or a system plans or intends to achieve or bring about – a personal or organizational desired end-point in some sort of assumed development. Many people endeavor to reach goals within a finite time by setting deadlines.
 Examples of business objectives
  
 Sustainable competitive advantage

Planning 

Planning – in organizations and public policy is both the organizational process of creating and maintaining a plan; and the psychological process of thinking about the activities required to create a desired goal on some scale. 
 
 Critical path method – Algorithm for scheduling a set of project activities
 PERT – 
 
 
 
 Business Process Modeling – (BPM) Activity of representing processes of an enterprise, so that the current ("as is") process may be analyzed and improved in future ("to be")

Approaches 

 Centralisation – Planning and decision making by a single authority
 Decentralization – Planning and decision making by various local authorities
 Management by objectives 
 Six Sigma – Business management strategy, originally developed by Motorola, that today enjoys widespread application in many sectors of industry
 Viable Systems Model

Feedback

Mistakes

Concepts

 Balanced scorecard – 
 Benchmarking – 
 Board of directors – 
 Business – 
 Business intelligence – 
 Business model – a profit-producing system that has an important degree of independence from the other systems within an enterprise. 
 Business operations – are those ongoing recurring activities involved in the running of a business for the purpose of producing value for the stakeholders. They are contrasted with project management, and consist of business processes. 
 Business process – is a collection of related, structured activities or tasks that produce a specific service or product (serve a particular goal) for a particular customer or customers. There are three types of business processes: Management processes, Operational processes, and Supporting processes.
 Case study – is a research method which involves an in-depth, longitudinal examination of a single instance or event: a case. They provide a systematic way of looking at events, collecting data, analyzing information, and reporting the results. 
 Change control – the procedures used to ensure that changes (normally, but not necessarily, to IT systems) are introduced in a controlled and coordinated manner. Change control is a major aspect of the broader discipline of change management.
 Corporate image – 
 
 Corporate title
 Costs – in economics, business, and accounting are the value of money that has been used up to produce something, and hence is not available for use anymore. In business, the cost may be one of acquisition, in which case the amount of money expended to acquire it is counted as cost.
 Critical success factor – 
 Cross ownership – 
 Cultural intelligence – 
 Deliverable – contractually required work product, produced and delivered to a required state. A deliverable may be a document, hardware, software or other tangible product.
 Enterprise modeling – is the process of understanding an enterprise business and improving its performance through creation of enterprise models. This includes the modelling of the relevant business domain (usually relatively stable), business processes (usually more volatile), and Information technology
 Environmental scanning – 
 Focused improvement – in Theory of Constraints is the ensemble of activities aimed at elevating the performance of any system, especially a business system, with respect to its goal by eliminating its constraints one by one and by not working on non-constraints.
 Fordism – named after Henry Ford, refers to various social theories. It has varying but related meanings in different fields, and for Marxist and non-Marxist scholars.
 Futures studies – 
 Industrial espionage
 Industry or market research
 Innovation – 
 Leadership – 
 Lean manufacturing – or lean production, which is often known simply as "Lean", is the practice of a theory of production that considers the expenditure of resources for any means other than the creation of value for the presumed customer to be wasteful, and thus a target for elimination.
 Level of Effort – (LOE) is qualified as a support type activity which doesn't lend itself to measurement of a discrete accomplishment. Examples of such an activity may be project budget accounting, customer liaison, etc.
 Manufacturing – 
 Marketing research – 
 Middle management – 
 Motivation – is the set of reasons that determines one to engage in a particular behavior.
 Operations research – (OR) interdisciplinary branch of applied mathematics and formal science that uses methods such as mathematical modeling, statistics, and algorithms to arrive at optimal or near optimal solutions to complex problems.
 Operations, see Business operations 
 Organization development – (OD) planned, structured, organization-wide effort to increase the organization's effectiveness and health.
 Organization – social arrangement which pursues collective goals, which controls its own performance, and which has a boundary separating it from its environment.
 Poison pill – 
 Portfolio – in finance is an appropriate mix of or collection of investments held by an institution or a private individual.
 Process architecture – structural design of general process systems and applies to fields such as computers (software, hardware, networks, etc.), business processes (enterprise architecture, policy and procedures, logistics, project management, etc.), and any other process system of varying degrees of complexity.
 Profit – 
 Proport – combination of the unique skills of an organisation's members for collective advantage.
 Quality – can mean a high degree of excellence ("a quality product"), a degree of excellence or the lack of it ("work of average quality"), or a property of something ("the addictive quality of alcohol").[1] Distinct from the vernacular, the subject of this article is the business interpretation of quality.
 Quality, Cost, Delivery (QCD) as used in lean manufacturing, measures a businesses activity and develops Key performance indicators. QCD analysis often forms a part of continuous improvement programs
 Reengineering – radical redesign of an organization's processes, especially its business processes. Rather than organizing a firm into functional specialties (like production, accounting, marketing, etc.) and considering the tasks that each function performs; complete processes from materials acquisition, to production, to marketing and distribution should be considered. The firm should be re-engineered into a series of processes.
 Reverse engineering – 
 Risk – is the precise probability of specific eventualities.
 Senior management – 
 Shareholder value – 
 Systems Development Life Cycle – (SDLC) is any logical process used by a systems analyst to develop an information system, including requirements, validation, training, and user ownership. An SDLC should result in a high quality system that meets or exceeds customer expectations, within time and cost estimates, works effectively and efficiently in the current and planned Information Technology infrastructure, and is cheap to maintain and cost-effective to enhance. 
 Systems engineering – is an interdisciplinary field of engineering that focuses on how complex engineering projects should be designed and managed.
 Task analysis – is the analysis or a breakdown of exactly how a task is accomplished, such as what sub-tasks are required 
 Timeline – is a graphical representation of a chronological sequence of events, also referred to as a chronology. It can also mean a schedule of activities, such as a timetable.
 Value engineering – (VE) is a systematic method to improve the "value" of goods and services by using an examination of function.  Value, as defined, is the ratio of function to cost.  Value can therefore be increased by either improving the function or reducing the cost.  It is a primary tenet of value engineering that basic functions be preserved and not be reduced as a consequence of pursuing value improvements.
 Wideband Delphi – is a consensus-based estimation technique for estimating effort.

Business management education 

 – teaching students the fundamentals, theories, and processes of business.
  – university-level institution that confers degrees in business administration or management. Such a school can also be known as "school of management", "school of business administration", or, colloquially, "b-school" or "biz school".
  
 
 
 Managerial academic degrees
 Undergraduate-level degrees
  
  
  
 
 Graduate-level degrees
   
 
 
 
  
 
 
  
 
 
 
 
  – equivalent to an MBA, but for the public sector.
 
 
 
 Doctoral-level degrees
 
  
 
 
 
 
  (double degree)

People in business management

Management positions 

  – person responsible for running an organization
  senior manager of an organization, company, or corporation
  high-ranking member of a corporation body, government or military
  person within a record label who works in senior management. Also known as a record executive.

Persons influential in business management 

 Pioneers of management methods
 , implemented six sigma throughout General Electric, leading to its widespread adoption throughout industry.
 , introduced management cybernetics to British steel industry and was responsible for the first use of computers in management.

See also 
 Archive 
  
  
  
  
 
 What to manage:
  
  
  
  
  
  
 
 
  
  
  
  
 
 
  
  
  
  
  
  
  
  
  (for administration of an insolvent)

References

Wing, Y, Hsing, M & Chen L (2008).Research on Business Strategy and Performance Evaluation in Collaborative Design. International Journal of Electronic Business Management. 6(2), 57–69.

External links 

Business management
Business management
outline
Management
Management topics